Dacrydium nidulum is a species of conifer in the family Podocarpaceae. It is found in Fiji, Indonesia, and Papua New Guinea.

Grows in moist locations, tree to 26m.

References

 Plant of PNG Search page 

nidulum
Least concern plants
Taxonomy articles created by Polbot
Taxa named by David John de Laubenfels